The Syrian Turkmen Assembly is a coalition of Syrian Turkmen political parties and groups representing Syrian Turkmens in the Syrian National Council and the Syrian National Coalition. It was established in December 2012 under the name Syrian Turkmen Platform to reconcile the two major Turkmen parties Syria Turkmen Bloc and the Syrian Democratic Turkmen Movement.

The military wing of the assembly is the Syrian Turkmen Brigades, and they are against the partition of Syria after the collapse of the Ba'athist government and they are protecting the Turkmen settlements and regions from the Syrian al-Assad government, ISIL, and the YPG, while participating in various offensives and sieges and also carrying out attacks on strategical positions for Turkmens and Turkey.

The assembly has been officially represented Syrian Turkmens in Geneva peace talks on Syria in 2016 as an official diplomatic part of the Syrian Opposition with Turkmen delegates.

History 

The first meeting of Syrian Turkmen Assembly was held in Istanbul on 15 December 2012, and the participants asserted that there is an inequity toward the Syrian Turkmens by the opposition forces as they do not give more seats in the Syrian National Coalition. They decided to meet and select the representatives of the assembly in the next meeting, and at the end of the first meeting, the common decision of Syrian Turkmen Assembly was declared: "Regardless of any ethnic or religious identity, a future in which everybody can be able to live commonly under the identity of Syrian is targeted in the future of Syria."

The second meeting of Syrian Turkmen Assembly took place in Ankara on 30 March 2013. Prime Minister Recep Tayyip Erdoğan, Foreign Minister Ahmet Davutoğlu, and George Sabra also participated in the meeting. Davutoğlu called the Turkmens to take an active role in the Syrian National Coalition and contribute within the new administration of Syria. In response, 350 Turkmen delegates from different parts of Syria joined the Coalition and elected 39 representatives for the Syrian Turkmen Assembly among the members of different groups and parties. It was also agreed that the assembly will be reelected once a year, and the meetings will be conducted once a quarter. At the moment, 18 representatives of Syrian Turkmen Assembly are represented in the Syrian National Council, and four members in the National Coalition for Syrian Revolutionary and Opposition Forces.

The representatives of Syrian Turkmen Assembly was constituted during the second organisation of Syrian Turkmen Platform on 30 March 2013, and that became the joining point of Syrian Turkmen National Bloc and Syrian Democratic Turkmen Movement, which are two different political movements of Syrian Turkmens. The assembly joined the two movements and with a joint agreement each movement have been given a region to focus.

On 31 December 2019, Syrian Turkmen Assembly announced the relocation of its headquarters into Al-Rai, Syria on Facebook, with several images of the unfinished building.

Gallery

References

Bibliography

External links
 Official website

Syrian Turkmen organizations
Political party alliances in Syria
Syrian National Council
Organizations established in 2012
2012 establishments in Turkey
Political parties of minorities in Syria